Kossmatella is an extinct genus of ammonoid cephalopods belonging to the family Lytoceratidae. These fast-moving nektonic carnivores  lived in the Cretaceous period, from Albian age to Cenomanian age.

Description
Shells of Eulytoceras species are quite small, with rounded whorl section and deep constrictions on the external surface.

Distribution
Fossils of species within this genus have been found in the Cretaceous rocks of Dominican Republic, France, Italy, Madagascar, Mexico, South Africa, Suriname and United States.

References

GBIF
 Arkell et al., Mesozoic Ammonoidea. Treatise on Invertebrate Paleontology, Part L. Geological Society of America, 1957. RC. Moore, ed.

Cretaceous ammonites
Ammonites of Europe
Albian genus first appearances
Cenomanian genus extinctions